Taxigramma heteroneura is a species of satellite fly in the family Sarcophagidae. It is found in Europe.

References

External links

Sarcophagidae
Articles created by Qbugbot
Insects described in 1830